The Ace of Scotland Yard is a 1929 Universal movie serial.  It was the first partial sound serial released by Universal Pictures. The film was released in September 1929.  It was a part-talkie serial using music and sound effects.

This serial was a sequel to the 1927 12-chapter silent Universal serial Blake of Scotland Yard.

Plot
Retired CID inspector Angus Blake tries to prevent a female jewel thief named the Queen of Diamonds from stealing a valuable ring which, according to legend, carries a curse.

Cast
Crauford Kent as Angus Blake, retired CID Inspector
Monte Montague as Jarvis, Blake's servant
Grace Cunard as Queen of Diamonds, famous jewel thief disguised as Lord Blanton's housekeeper Mary Duveen
 Florence Allen as Lady Diana Blanton, Lord Blanton's daughter
Herbert Prior as Lord Blanton, owner of the cursed ring
Albert Prisco as Prince Darius, desires the ring and hires the Queen of Diamonds to steal it

Production
In addition to the sound version, a silent version of the cliffhanger was made for theatres not equipped to display sound films. Harold M. Atkinson wrote the serial and Ray Taylor directed it.

Chapter titles
The Fatal Circlet
A Cry in the Night
The Dungeon of Doom
Menace of the Mummy
The Depths of Limehouse
Dead or Alive
Shadows of Fear
The Baited Trap
A Battle of Wits
The Fatal Judgement

Reception
Movie Age gave a positive review of the serial after watching the first three chapters, noting that "the picture carries a punch" and "if the succeeding chapters measure up with the first three, this serial is going to be a wow." The Film Daily declared it "a gripping serial [that] carries a lot of fast action and suspense", specifically stating: "The camera work is exceptionally good, and the direction by Ray Taylor is aces."

See also
List of film serials
List of film serials by studio

References

Footnotes

Sources

External links

 

1929 films
1929 mystery films
American mystery thriller films
American silent serial films
American black-and-white films
American detective films
1920s English-language films
Films directed by Ray Taylor
Lost American films
Films set in London
Transitional sound films
Universal Pictures film serials
1929 lost films
1920s American films
1920s mystery thriller films
Silent mystery thriller films